David Frey (born 8 December 1991) is a Swiss footballer. He has no Club since 2016.

Career 
David Frey began his career in the 2008/09 season at FC Thun in the Challenge League, for whose professional team he made his debut in Switzerland's second division against FC Gossau on 6 October 2008. Overall, he had nine appearances with the FC Thun, but did not score a goal. His transfer to the BSC Young Boys was announced in July 2009. The midfielder was reportedly awarded a one-year contract. In the 2009/10 season he was a temporary member of the Young Boys' professional squad, but until the end of the season was only employed in their U-21 team in the third highest league, the first division.

His younger brother Michael Frey played in the first team of the BSC Young Boys in 2012-2014 and played since for many different first division teams outside of Switzerland. In June 2021 the striker signed a three year contract with Royal Antwerp Football Club.

References

External links
 

Swiss men's footballers
Swiss Super League players
FC Thun players
1991 births
Living people
Association football defenders
FC Münsingen players